Asbjørn Gaarde Agergaard (born 10 January 2003) is a Danish footballer who plays as a left winger for Danish 1st Division club AC Horsens.

Career

Horsens
Gaarde joined AC Horsens from FC Skanderborg at the age of 16.

On 19 May 2021, Gaarde was called up for his first professional game. Gaarde got his debut a day later, on 20 May 2021, against SønderjyskE in the Danish Superliga. Gaarde started on the bench, but replaced James Gomez in the 86th minute.

References

External links

2003 births
Living people
Danish men's footballers
Association football wingers
Danish Superliga players
AC Horsens players